Mountain of Fire and Miracles Football Club, or simply MFM FC, is a Lagos-based Nigerian professional football club that competes in the Nigerian nationwide league(3rd division ) of Nigerian football . The club is wholly owned by the Mountain of Fire and Miracles Ministries, a Pentecostal Christian Organization.

History
In 2013, MFM FC took over the slot of Bolowatan F.C. in the Nigeria National League, the second-tier division in Nigerian football. The founder of Bolowotan FC, Toyin Gafaar, a Muslim, handed the slot to the church (MFM) to manage without collecting any money in return. On 31 August 2015, MFM FC was promoted to the Nigeria Premier League.

The Mountain of Fire and Miracles Ministries Football Club of Lagos won the maiden edition of The Church World Cup. The Nigeria representatives achieved this feat after defeating the United Church of Colombia 7–0 in the final of the mundial which took place in Goa, India. MFM FC dominated the encounter from the outset in what turned out to be a mismatch.

MFM FC made their historic Nigeria Professional Football League debut as they beat the Solid Miners' of Nasarawa United by 2–1 on tentative home soil at the Aper Aku Stadium in Markudi, Benue State of Nigeria. Former Sunshine Stars of Akure player, Musa Newman received the first-ever goal of the club in their first NPFL game in the 18th minute and Chukwuka Emmanuel's second gave the debutants a two-goal lead, before Ifeanyi Nweke of Nasarawa United pulled one back.

After week four of the 2015–16 NPFL, 'The Olukoya Boys' of MFM FC were already in a comfortable second position tied with the same 9 points as the Lobi Stars, with three wins and one loss (a 3–0 defeat at the '3SC' Shooting Stars of Ibadan).

Current squad
As of March 2020

References

External links
Teams profile – Soccerway.com

 
Football clubs in Nigeria
Association football clubs established in 2007
2007 establishments in Nigeria